Panai Hilir (Downstream Panai) is a district of Labuhan Batu Regency in North Sumatra Province of Indonesia. It had a population of 35,811 at the 2010 Census, which rose to 42,761 at the 2020 Census.

There are seven villages in the district:

 Sei Sanggul
 Sei Lumut
 Sei Sakat
 Sei Baru
 Wonosari
 Sei Tawar
 Sei Penggantungan

References

Districts of North Sumatra